Funny Bones is a 1995 comedy-drama film from Hollywood Pictures. It was written, directed and produced by Peter Chelsom, co produced by Simon Fields, and co written by Peter Flannery. The music score was by John Altman, and the cinematography by Eduardo Serra. Funny Bones was released in the United States on 31 March 1995.

Set in Las Vegas and Blackpool, England, the film stars Oliver Platt, Jerry Lewis, Lee Evans, Leslie Caron, Richard Griffiths, Sadie Corre, Oliver Reed, George Carl, Freddie Davies and Ian McNeice. When the film was released in the United Kingdom, it reached #8 in the Top 10.

Plot
Tommy Fawkes is the son of British comedy legend George Fawkes. After his own Las Vegas comedy act flops with his beloved father in the audience, Tommy returns to Blackpool, where he spent the summers of his childhood.

Disguised with a new identity, Tommy intends to seek out unique performers and purchase their acts. During this time, Tommy encounters his father's old comedy partners, Bruno and Thomas Parker. Once great performers, they now work as ghouls on a ghost train at Blackpool Pleasure Beach Circus.

Bruno's son Jack is a brilliant comic,  but psychologically troubled. He has also been manipulated by a corrupt policeman known as Sharkey into stealing valuable wax eggs from smugglers. Tommy meets Jack's mother Katie, and even though Tommy is in disguise, she suspects that he is somehow connected to the family.

Tommy eventually realises that his father stole his original act from the Parker brothers. He then reveals himself to be Tommy Fawkes and Katie tells him that Jack is his half-brother. Tommy phones his father about the revelation and George gets on the next plane to Blackpool.

As part of their reconciliation, George arranges for the Parkers to top the bill at a Blackpool Tower Circus event. However, Jack is still hounded by Sharkey and cannot perform. During an elaborate Egyptian act, Katie gets rid of Sharkey via a sarcophagus, which is then kidnapped by the smugglers. The wax eggs (Chinese inscription on egg is read "Eight Immortals") contained a mystical, ancient Chinese rejuvenating powder. Jack had previously placed the powder within a makeup tin, which Bruno and Thomas accidentally use, helping them to perform brilliantly.

Toward the end of the show, Jack is seen being chased by a policeman and climbing a giant flexible pole to escape. The policeman begins to fall and is revealed to be Tommy.

In the last moments, Jack clasps Tommy's hand and saves him, both now wildly swinging around at the end of pole.  The circus audience claps wildly with relief.  Jack yells to Tommy, "I think they're beginning to like you." Jack laughs and Tommy, suddenly no longer afraid, waves at the audience spinning past and laughs joyfully.

Cast
 Oliver Platt as Tommy Fawkes
 Jerry Lewis as George Fawkes
 Lee Evans as Jack Parker
 Leslie Caron as Katie Parker
 Richard Griffiths as Jim Minty
 Sadie Corre as Poodle Woman
 Oliver Reed as Dolly Hopkins
 George Carl as Thomas Parker
 Freddie Davies as Bruno Parker
 Ian McNeice as Stanley Sharkey
 Christopher Greet as Lawrence Berger
 Ruta Lee as Laura Fawkes
 Harold Nicholas as himself
 Peter Gunn as Nicky

Home media
Funny Bones was released on DVD on 2 September 2003.

Reception
On Rotten Tomatoes, the film has an approval rating of 63%, based on 19 reviews, with an average rating of 6.4/10.

References

External links
 
 
 
 

1995 films
1995 comedy-drama films
American comedy-drama films
British comedy-drama films
Films set in Blackpool
Hollywood Pictures films
Films directed by Peter Chelsom
1990s English-language films
1990s American films
1990s British films